The Brothers is a 1769 comedy play by Richard Cumberland. The play was Cumberland's breakthrough work. Its complicated plot involved a villain with a virtuous young brother and was set partly in Cornwall. Two years later Cumberland went on to write his most successful work The West Indian.

References

Bibliography
 Mudford, William. The Life of Richard Cumberland. Sherwood, Neely & Jones, 1812.
 Nettleton, George H. & Case, Arthur E. British Dramatists from Dryden to Sheridan. Southern Illinois University Press, 1975.
 Sherburne, George and Bond, Donald F. A Literary History of England, Volume III: The Restoration and Eighteenth Century. Routledge and Kegan Paul, 1967.

Plays by Richard Cumberland
1769 plays